Julian Blaustein (May 30, 1913 – June 20, 1995) was an American film producer. Born in New York City, Blaustein graduated from Harvard University in 1933. He spent a year in flight training at the Randolph Air Force Base before heading to Hollywood, where he became a reader in the story department at Universal Pictures. He eventually was promoted to department head. He left Universal to work in a similar position at Paramount Pictures.

During World War II, Blaustein produced training films for the United States Army Signal Corps in Astoria, New York. Following the war, he returned to Los Angeles and joined David O. Selznick Productions. Two years later, he joined 20th Century Fox, but in 1955 he left the studio to become an independent producer under the Phoenix name.

After retiring from the film industry, Blaustein became an Adjunct Professor of Communication at Stanford University, where he taught documentary writing and directing and supervised a Master's program in screenwriting. Following his retirement from teaching, he returned to Beverly Hills, where he became an active member of the Academy of Motion Picture Arts and Sciences and a trustee of the Motion Picture and Television Fund.

Blaustein and his wife had a son John and a daughter Laurie. He died of cancer in his home in Beverly Hills.

Selected filmography
Broken Arrow (1950)
Mister 880 (1950)
Half Angel (1951)
The Day the Earth Stood Still (1951)
Don't Bother to Knock (1952)
The Outcasts of Poker Flat (1952)Désirée (1954)Storm Center (1955)Bell Book and Candle (1958)Two Loves (1961)Four Horsemen of the Apocalypse (1962)Khartoum (1966)Three into Two Won't Go'' (1969)

References
Stanford memorial resolution

External links

1913 births
1995 deaths
20th-century American businesspeople
Businesspeople from New York City
Deaths from cancer in California
Film producers from New York (state)
Harvard University alumni
Stanford University Department of Communication faculty